Raphael Mazzucco, or Rafael Mazzucco, is a Canadian fashion, art and music photographer.  His photographs have appeared on the cover of three Sports Illustrated Swimsuit Issues in a four-year span, including the 2006, 2008 and 2009 main cover images, as well as the books: Sports Illustrated: Exposure (2006, Time, Inc. Home Entertainment) and A Second Decade of Guess Images: 1991-2001.   He was also commissioned to shoot Victoria's Secret's coffee table book.

He is known for starting his photo sessions with very tight shots from up-close to his subjects faces. He is also well known for his Guess campaigns. He photographed Megan Ewing twice a year when she was a Guess Girl.

His career started with work for Calvin Klein and as a music photographer. He then lived in Milan, Italy, for three years while continuing photography but emphasizing more fashion than music. He is a native of Vancouver, British Columbia, Canada, who is currently based in New York City, and has a home is in Montauk, New York.

In 2011, he played himself on Entourage in the episode "The Big Bang" where the series main character Vincent Chase was photographed for the cover of a magazine.  The scene features a coffee table book by Sean Combs and Jimmy Iovine called Culo.

References

External links 
 Personal website
 Valmorbida
 Preview on Youtube (2011-10-12)
 Canada Soccer profile

Fashion photographers
Living people
Artists from Vancouver
Canadian portrait photographers
Year of birth missing (living people)
People from Montauk, New York
Canadian music video directors